Zavaraq (also Romanized as Zavāraq; also known as Tāzeh Kand-e Zavāraq) is a village in Benajuy-ye Gharbi Rural District, in the Central District of Bonab County, East Azerbaijan Province, Iran. At the 2006 census, its population was 2,247, in 573 families.

References 

Populated places in Bonab County